The Oakland Public Schools is a comprehensive community public school district serving students in kindergarten through eighth grade from the borough of Oakland in Bergen County, New Jersey, United States.

As of the 2018–19 school year, the district, comprising four schools, had an enrollment of 1,362 students and 132.2 classroom teachers (on an FTE basis), for a student–teacher ratio of 10.3:1.

The district is classified by the New Jersey Department of Education as being in District Factor Group "I", the second-highest of eight groupings. District Factor Groups organize districts statewide to allow comparison by common socioeconomic characteristics of the local districts. From lowest socioeconomic status to highest, the categories are A, B, CD, DE, FG, GH, I and J.

Students in ninth through twelfth grades for public school attend the schools of the Ramapo Indian Hills Regional High School District, a regional district serving students from Franklin Lakes, Oakland and Wyckoff. Students entering the district as freshmen have the option to attend either of the district's high schools, regardless of their residence, subject to a choice made during eighth grade. Schools in the district (with 2018–19 enrollment data from the National Center for Education Statistics) are
Indian Hills High School, located in Oakland (1,062 students) and
Ramapo High School, located in Franklin Lakes (1,222 students).

Schools 
Schools in the district (with 2018–19 enrollment data from the National Center for Education Statistics) are:
Elementary schools
Dogwood Hill Elementary School with 247 students in grades K-5
Sean Bowe, Principal
Heights Elementary School with 347 students in grades K-5
Robyn Greenwald, Principal
Manito Elementary School with 266 students in grades K-5
Adam Silverstein, Principal
Middle school
Valley Middle School with 473 students in grades 6-8)
Gregg Desiderio, Principal

Administration 
Core members of the district's administration are:
Dr. Gina M. Coffaro, Superintendent of Schools
Annette Wells, School Business Administrator / Board Secretary

Board of education
The district's board of education, with five members, sets policy and oversees the fiscal and educational operation of the district through its administration. As a Type II school district, the board's trustees are elected directly by voters to serve three-year terms of office on a staggered basis, with either one or two seats up for election each year held as part of the April school election. As one of the 13 districts statewide with school elections in April (five of which are in Bergen County), voters also decide on passage of the annual school budget.

References

External links 
Oakland Public Schools
Ramapo Indian Hills Regional High School District website

School Data for the Oakland Public Schools, National Center for Education Statistics

Oakland, New Jersey
New Jersey District Factor Group I
School districts in Bergen County, New Jersey